Hartington Middle Quarter is a civil parish in the Derbyshire Dales district of Derbyshire, England.  The parish contains 14 listed buildings that are recorded in the National Heritage List for England.  All the listed buildings are designated at Grade II, the lowest of the three grades, which is applied to "buildings of national importance and special interest".  The parish, which is to the north of the village of Hartington, is almost entirely rural, the main settlements being the villages of Earl Sterndale and Crowdecote.  Most of the listed buildings are houses, cottages, farmhouses and associated structures, and the other listed buildings are a church, a school, a bridge, and a milepost.


Buildings

References

Citations

Sources

 

Lists of listed buildings in Derbyshire